Maya Arad Yasur (born 1976) is an Israeli playwright. Yasur's works have been produced worldwide, translated to over thirteen languages and are published in Chinese, English, French, German, Hebrew, Russian, Italian and Polish. She is the recipient of the Theatertreffen's Stückemarkt prize 2018. Yasur is known for her knotty and complex form of fractured narratives.

Early life 
Yasur was born in the Israeli city of Ramat Gan and went to high school in Tel-Aviv, majoring in Film and Photography, she went on to the Hebrew University in Jerusalem where she studied Theatre, Communication and Journalism studies. She holds a Master's degree in dramaturgy from the University of Amsterdam where she graduated with distinction.

Career 
Yasur's plays have been staged and publicly read in various theatres in Israel, France, the UK, Germany, Austria, Serbia, Slovenia, Cyprus, Norway, Finland and the U.S. Yasur worked as the dramaturg on several performances by Serbian-Dutch theatre-maker Sanja Mitrović and was the dramaturg of the series Het Beloofde Feest by the Dutch theatre-maker Ilay den Boer. Her play Amsterdam received its English language premier at the Orange Tree Theatre in London in 2019, produced by the Actors Touring Company, an extensive UK tour followed. Lyn Gardner admired the bravado of the fractured structure which mixed thriller with a multitude of voices and likened the use of unstable perspectives to Prebble's A Very Expensive Poison.

Plays 
Triage opened at Beit Lessin Theatre in Tel-Aviv in January 2023 directed by Ilan Ronen.
 God Waits at the Station opened at Habima – Israel's national theatre in 2014, at Volkstheater Vienna in 2015 at the Schauspiel Dresden in 2016 and at the Theater Paderborn in 2017. It had a staged reading at AdK Berlin. 
 Ten Minutes from Home opened at Habima - Israel's national Theatre in 2015.
 Suspended opened at Upstream Theatre in St. Louis in 2016 and received its German premiere at Deutsches Theater Göttingen (October 2018).
 Amsterdam premiered at the Haifa Theater (Israel) July 2018, Volkstheater Munich (Feb. 2019).

Production history 
2023: Bomb - Variations on Refusal, Theater Lübeck, Germany.
2023: Gott Wartet an der Haltestelle (God Waits at the Station), Theater Kiel, Germany.
2023: Triage, Beit Lessin Theatre, Tel-Aviv.
2022: Amsterdam, Oldenburgisches Staatstheater, Oldenburg, Germany
2022: Amsterdam,  Theater Nestroyhof, Vienna
2022: Amsterdam, Le menteur volontaire, France 
2022: Amsterdam, Staatstheater Darmstadt
2021: Amsterdam, Hessisches Landestheater Marburg, Germany
2020 : Blaue Stille, Landestheater Schwaben Memmingen, Germany
2020 : Bomb, Schauspiel Cologne, Germany 
2019 : Amsterdam, Scene Dock Theatre, Los Angeles, USA.
2019: Amsterdam, Orange Tree Theatre, UK
2019 : Amsterdam, Theater Kiel, Germany
2019: Amsterdam : Festival LA MOUSSON D’ÉTÉ, France (staged reading)  
2019: Amsterdam, Regards Croises Festival, Grenoble (staged reading)
2019: Amsterdam, Volkstheater Munich
2019: Suspended, Thalia Theater, Hamburg
2018: Suspended, Deutsches Theater Göttingen
2018: Amsterdam, Haifa Theater
2017: Gott Wartet an der Haltestelle, Theater Paderborn
2016: Gott Wartet an der Haltestelle, Staatsschauspiel Dresden
2016: Suspended, Upstream Theatre, St. Louis, USA.
2015: Ten Minutes from Home, Habima –Israel's National Theatre
2015: Gott Wartet an der Haltestelle, AdK Berlin (staged reading)
2015: Gott Wartet an der Haltestelle, Volkstheater Wien
2014: God Waits at the Station, Habima –Israel's National Theatre
2012: Diamond Stars, The Blank Theater, Los Angeles (staged reading)
2011: Diamond Stars, Det Norske Teatret, Oslo (staged reading)

Published works 
 God Waits at the Station. Theater der Zeit, 2016 (German) 
 God Waits at the Station Dialog, 2017 (Polish)
 Suspended. Theater: periodical for contemporary theater, 2018 (Hebrew)
 Focalizing Bodies: Visual Narratology in the Post-Dramatic Theatre. (English)  
 Amsterdam. translated by Eran Edry. London: Nick Hern Books, 2019. 
 Amsterdam. translated by  Laurence Sendrowicz. Paris: Éditions Théâtrales, 2019.  
 Suspended. translated by Guan Hui. In New Drama publication. Shanghai: Office of New Drama, 2019. 
 Amsterdam translated by Sarah Kaminski and Maria Teresa Milano. Rome: Modern Times Publishers, 2021.

Dramaturgical work 
2021: Salomonsoordeel, tgilay (dir. Ilay den Boer), Holland
2012: Everyone Expects to Grow Old but No One Expects to Get Fired, European Capital of Culture and Teater Oficinia Guimaraes, Portugal
2012: Crash Course Chit Chat, Huis a/d Werf, Utrecht, Holland
2012: Broer, Festival Over het Ij, Amsterdam
2011: Zoek het Lekker Zelf Uit!, Het huis van Bourgondie and Het Lab Utrecht. Premiere at Festival a/d Werf, Utrecht, the Netherlands. Winner of The Silver Cricket award 
2011: DayDream House, Festival a/d Werf, Utrecht, the Netherlands
2010: A Short History of Crying, Hetveem Theater, Amsterdam
2010: Dit is mijn vader, Het huis van Bourgondie. Selected for the Netherlands Theater Festival 2010 (Best 10 performances of the year in Holland and Belgium) and won the BNG award 2011
2009: Janken en Schieten, Over Het Ij Festival Amsterdam and Het huis van Bourgondie Maastricht

Awards and honours 
 1st prize of the international playwriting competition of ITI–UNESCO for Suspended (2011)
 Habima (Israel's national theatre) prize for emerging playwrights for God Waits at the Station (2014)
 The Berliner Theatertreffen's Stückemarkt prize for Amsterdam (2018)
 The Tel-Aviv Rosenblum Award for performing Arts (2022)

References 

Living people
1976 births
Place of birth missing (living people)
Israeli female dramatists and playwrights
University of Amsterdam alumni
Dramaturges